"I Feel Love" is a song by American singer and songwriter Donna Summer. Produced and co-written by Giorgio Moroder and Pete Bellotte, it was recorded for Summer's fifth studio album, I Remember Yesterday (1977). The album concept was to have each track evoke a different musical decade; for "I Feel Love", the team aimed to create a futuristic mood, employing a Moog synthesizer. 

"I Feel Love" was released just before the album on May 1, 1977, as the B-side to the single "Can't We Just Sit Down (And Talk It Over)", which reached number 20 on the US Billboard R&B chart. Two months later, the sides were reversed and the single was reissued. "I Feel Love" reached number one in countries including Australia, Austria, Belgium, the Netherlands and the United Kingdom, and reached number three in West Germany and number six on the US Billboard Hot 100.

"I Feel Love" became popular during the disco era, influencing acts such as David Bowie, Brian Eno, the Human League and Blondie. The Financial Times credited it as "one of the most influential records ever made", laying the foundations for electronic dance music. In 2011, the Library of Congress added it to the National Recording Registry as "culturally, historically, or aesthetically important". It has been covered by acts including Bronski Beat, Messiah and Sam Smith.

Recording

In 1970s Munich, Musicland Studios, led by the producers Giorgio Moroder and Pete Bellotte, had produced a number of disco hits, including Donna Summer's 1975 single "Love to Love You Baby". Summer had moved from the US to Munich to perform in the musical Hair, and had become a successful session vocalist. Moroder described her as "an incredibly talented singer, who could improvise but was also very disciplined".

For Summer's fifth album, I Remember Yesterday (1977), the production team wanted each track to evoke a different musical decade, such as '40s swing, '60s girl groups, and '70s funk and disco. For the final track, "I Feel Love", the team wanted to create a futuristic mood. Whereas most disco recordings had been backed by orchestras, the team produced "I Feel Love" with a modular Moog synthesizer borrowed from the classical composer Eberhard Schoener, aided by Schoener's assistant, Robby Wedel. Wedel demonstrated how to synchronize the elements using a click track, a feat Moroder described as "a revelation". Wedel's help with the technically complex synthesizer proved essential, and Moroder described him as the "unsung hero" of the project.

"I Feel Love" was recorded on a 16-track tape recorder, with the various parts played on a sequencer. As the Moog went out of tune quickly, it had to be recorded in bursts of 20 or 30 seconds before being retuned. To create the hi-hat sound, the team took white noise generated by the Moog and processed it with an envelope. As the Moog could not create a satisfactory kick drum sound, the kick was played on a drum kit by session drummer Keith Forsey. Aside from the vocals, the kick drum is the only element of the song not played by a machine.

Unusually for a disco track of the era, Moroder composed the backing track and bassline before the melody. He introduced variety by altering the key at regular intervals and layering Summer's vocals. Each note of the bassline is doubled by a delay effect. The unmodified bassline plays through the left channel and the slightly delayed repetition through the right, creating a flickering, strobe-like effect.

The lyrics were written by Bellotte. Summer recorded her vocal in one take. In contrast to the deeper chest voice of most disco vocals, Summer sang in head voice.

Composition
"I Feel Love" is in the key of C major, with electronic dance flavor, and choruses and interludes. The album version has a length of 5:53. It was extended to 8:15 for release as a 12" maxi-single, and is included on the 1989 compilation The Dance Collection: A Compilation of Twelve Inch Singles. The song was edited to 3:45 on the 7" format, the fade-in opening sound reaching maximum volume sooner and fades out before the third verse and final choruses. This version has been included on a large number of greatest hits packages and other compilations issued by PolyGram, Mercury Records, Universal Music and others, such as 1994's Endless Summer: Greatest Hits and 2003's The Journey: The Very Best of Donna Summer.  A new edit of 3:20 was released on Donna Summer's first compilation album On the Radio: Greatest Hits Volumes I & II.

Critical reception
According to the singer David Bowie, who was then recording his Berlin Trilogy, his collaborator Brian Eno "came running in" and told him he had heard "the sound of the future". According to Bowie, Eno predicted that "I Feel Love" would change the sound of club music for the next fifteen years, which "was more or less right".

Record World said the song "establishes a mood first, then builds on it" and praised the "captivating" synthesizer.

Robert Moog, the creator of the Moog synthesizer, was critical, saying:

The music critic Vince Aletti wrote that "the pace is fierce and utterly gripping with the synthesizer effects particularly aggressive and emotionally charged". He predicted that the track "should easily equal if not surpass" the success of "Love to Love You Baby" in the clubs.

Sales
"I Feel Love" peaked at number six on the Billboard Hot 100 chart the week of November 12, 1977. It reached number nine on the Soul Singles Chart in October 1977. Its 1995 remix peaked at number nine on the  Billboard Hot Dance Club Play.

In the United Kingdom, "I Feel Love" peaked at the top of the UK Singles Chart in July 1977, a position it maintained for four weeks. The 1982 and 1995 remixes of the song peaked at number 21 and number eight on the UK Singles Chart respectively, and sales of these physical singles totaled 956,400. According to the Official Charts Company, together with digital sales, "I Feel Love" has sold 1.07 million copies in the United Kingdom as of June 2013, making it Britain's 103rd best-selling single of all time.

Elsewhere, "I Feel Love" also topped the charts in Australia, Austria, Belgium, France, Italy and the Netherlands, and peaked within the top ten of the charts in Canada, West Germany, New Zealand, Norway, the Republic of Ireland, South Africa, Sweden and Switzerland.

Legacy
The song was used as a sample on a remix by Eric Kupper of Summer's own single, "Love Is the Healer" (1999). It became her twelfth number-one single on the US dance chart.

In a 2017 feature on the song's 40th anniversary for Pitchfork, the journalist Simon Reynolds reflected that "I Feel Love" had a significant impact on music across all genres for the next decade, including rock-leaning genres such as post-punk and new wave, and subsequent sub-genres of the electronic dance music style the song had pioneered, including Hi-NRG, Italo disco, house, techno, and trance. Reynolds also posited "If any one song can be pinpointed as where the 1980s began, it's 'I Feel Love'."

Mixmag ranked the song number 12 in its 100 Greatest Dance Singles Of All Time list in 1996, writing that "whenever, however you hear this tune, it's guaranteed to make you smile, shut your eyes and trance out. The first electronic disco masterpiece, disco diva Donna and Moroder's finest, trippiest moment. Whether it's Derrick May or Carl Craig slipping Patrick Cowley's deliciously psychedelic 1982 remix into their techno sets, or Masters at Work climaxing a four deck set with last years garaged-up remake, or just some bloke in a bow tie playing the original at your brother's wedding, this record is timeless. And priceless."

In 2013, Mixmag ranked it number 19 in its '50 Greatest Dance Tracks Of All Time. Slant ranked the song 1st in its 100 Greatest Dance Songs-list in 2006, writing:

No longer would synthesizers remain the intellectual property of prog-classical geeks. And, separated from its LP context and taken as a Top 10 single, it didn't just suggest the future, it was the future. Cooing ascending couplets of an almost banal ecstasy, Summer's breathy vocals still dwelled in the stratosphere of her own manufactured sensation.

In 2011, The Guardians Richard Vine ranked the release of "I Feel Love" as one of 50 key events in the history of dance music, proclaiming it "one of the first to fully utilise the potential of electronics, replacing lush disco orchestration with the hypnotic precision of machines".

Time Out listed the song number 12 in their The 100 best party songs list in 2015, writing that "Sometimes a song comes along that’s so innovative that it changes the shape of the musical landscape for decades, whilst also getting you to shake yo bootay. This timeless, Giorgio Moroder–produced disco anthem from 1977 did exactly that, becoming the first purely electronic jam to make it big and pretty much inventing dance music in the process."

Critics' lists
The information regarding lists including "I Feel Love" is adapted from Acclaimed Music, except where otherwise noted. Asterisk designates lists that are unordered.

Track listings

 U.S. 7"   
 "I Feel Love" – 5:53
 "Can't We Just Sit Down (And Talk It Over)" – 4:25

 U.S. Promo 7"   {{font |text=Casablanca  NB 884 DJ"|size=90%}}
 "I Feel Love" – 3:42
 "I Feel Love" - 3:42

 12" maxi  
 "I Feel Love" – 8:15
 "Love to Love You" – 16:50

 Single-Side - 12" maxi  
 "I Feel Love" – 8:15
 "Theme from the Deep (Down, Deep Inside)" – 6:06

Charts

Weekly charts

Year-end charts

Certifications and sales

Patrick Cowley remix
In 1978, disco and Hi-NRG DJ Patrick Cowley created a 15:43 remix of "I Feel Love" which became a popular "underground classic", available only for members of the Disconet remix service. Cowley used loops to keep the bass-line going for extended passages of overdubbed effects and synthesiser parts.

In mid-1980, Cowley's mix was released with the title "I Feel Love / I Feel Megalove" and subtitle "The Patrick Cowley MegaMix", but only on a limited vinyl pressing by the DJ-only subscription service Disconet. Since this pressing was not available to the general public for commercial sale, it became highly sought after by collectors. In 1982, it was released as a 12" single in the UK market by Casablanca, backed with an 8-minute edited version. With this wider release, "I Feel Love" became a dance floor hit again, five years after its debut. A further-edited 7" single reached number 21 on the UK Singles Chart.

The Patrick Cowley mix was out of print until it was released on the bonus disc of the 2003 UK edition of The Journey: The Very Best of Donna Summer and the Ben Liebrand compilation album Grand 12-Inches. It also exists on the 2013 double disc I Feel Love: The Collection.

1995 and 2013 remixes

Following 1993's The Donna Summer Anthology and 1994's Endless Summer: Greatest Hits, both released by PolyGram, "I Feel Love" was re-released on the PolyGram sublabel Manifesto in a newly remixed form as a single in 1995, including mixes by Masters at Work and production duo Rollo & Sister Bliss of UK electronic group Faithless – and also new vocals by Summer. The single became a UK number 8 hit, the second time the song had entered the Top 10, and the '95 Radio Edit was later included as a bonus track on PolyGram France's version of the Endless Summer compilation.  The 1995 release also peaked at number 80 in Australia.

In 2013, a remix by Dutch DJ Afrojack was released together with remixes by other DJs of other Donna Summer songs.

Reception
James Masterton for Dotmusic complimented the 1995 remix for "not to tinker too much with the near-perfect realisation of the original", adding that it "still sounds as fresh as the day it was made". Alan Jones Music Week said the Masters At Work mixes of the track are "a trifle disappointing", while praising the Rollo & Sister Bliss remix. He explained, "The Rollo & Sister Bliss mix grows and grows, picking up vocals and some nifty and airy synth riffs along the way, building into a superb house stomper. A masterful piece of work, and one that will surely launch the new Manifeste label in style." The magazine's RM Dance Update stated, "The big guns are brought out to remix the classic disco anthem – Rollo and MAW".

Track listings
 7", UK (1995)
"I Feel Love" (Rollo & Sister Bliss Monster Mix) – 3:50
"I Feel Love" (Summer 77 Re-Eq' 95) – 5:51

 CD single, Europe (1995)
"I Feel Love" (Rollo & Sister Bliss Monster Mix) (Radio Edit) – 3:54
"I Feel Love" (Rollo & Sister Bliss Monster Mix) – 6:30
"I Feel Love" (12" MAW Mix) – 6:08

 CD maxi, Canada (1995)
"I Feel Love" (Rollo & Sister Bliss Monster Mix) – 6:31
"I Feel Love" (Masters At Work 86th St. Mix) – 6:09
"I Feel Love" (Summer '77 Re-EQ '95) – 5:51
"Melody of Love (Wanna Be Loved)" (Junior Vasquez DMC Remix) – 5:53

Charts

Weekly charts

Year-end charts

Bronski Beat versions
Bronski Beat included a medley of "I Feel Love" with "Johnny Remember Me" on their gay-themed album The Age of Consent in 1984.  The album charted in many markets and went platinum in the UK and Canada, with gay anthems "Smalltown Boy" and "Why?" hitting the top 10 in the UK, Australia, Germany, France, and several other European markets, as well as being popular on U.S. dancefloors. Jimmy Somerville left Bronski Beat in 1985 and went on to have success as lead singer of The Communards and as a solo artist.Hundreds & Thousands included two new recordings with Somerville and remixes of The Age of Consent songs; it was released in 1985.  The "I Feel Love" medley was extended with an intro of a cover of Summer's "Love to Love You Baby" and John Leyton's "Johnny Remember Me" with some new vocals from Marc Almond from Soft Cell; it was released as a single that hit No. 3 in the UK.

Messiah version

English electronic duo Messiah released its version of "I Feel Love" in 1992, featuring singer Precious Wilson on vocals. This version was a top-20 hit, peaking at No. 19 on the UK Singles Chart. In the US, it was released as a single in 1994 and reached No. 15 on the Billboard Dance Club Songs chart in early 1995, spending a total of 10 weeks on the chart.

Track listings
UK 12"
A. "I Feel Love" – 4:11
B1. "The Future Is Ours" – 3:45
B2. "I Feel Love (Voxless)" – 4:03

US 12" maxi
A1. "I Feel Love" (Centurion Mix)
A2. "I Feel Love" (Journey of Love)
A3. "I Feel Love" (Sellout Pussy Radio Mix)
B1. "I Feel Love" (I Feel Dub)
B2. "I Feel Love" (Kiss My Beat and Move)
B3. "I Feel Love" (American Version)

Charts

 Vanessa-Mae version 
Singaporean-born British singer-violinist Vanessa-Mae released a cover of "I Feel Love" in December 1997. It peaked at number 41 on the UK Singles Chart, and spent two weeks on the chart. The song was the second single from Vanessa-Mae's 1997 album Storm.

Track listings
CD1 (CDEM503)

 "I Feel Love" (Single Version) - 4.23
 "Storm" (Single Version) - 3.48
 "Classical Gas" (Stradosphere Mix) - 8.15

CD2 (CDEMS503)

 "I Feel Love" (Single Version) - 4.23
 "I Feel Love" (Klubbheads vs Rollercoaster Mix) - 8.29
 "I Feel Love" (D-Bop Saturday Nite Mix) - 8.47

Sam Smith version

British singer Sam Smith released a cover of "I Feel Love" on November 1, 2019. Smith described it as a queer anthem and the "highest song" they had ever sung. The song was planned for inclusion on Smith's third studio album, Love Goes'', but was removed after Smith delayed the album release.

Track listingDigital download / streaming"I Feel Love" – 4:1412" picture disc'
"I Feel Love"
"I Feel Love" (Extended)

Charts

Weekly charts

Year-end charts

Release history

References

External links
 Donna Summer · I Feel Love Provided to YouTube by Universal Music Group
 Donna Summer · I Feel Love (Live) Licensed to YouTube by UMG (on behalf of Island Mercury)...

1977 songs
1977 singles
1992 singles
1997 singles
2003 singles
2019 singles
Casablanca Records singles
Capitol Records singles
Mercury Records singles
American Recordings (record label) singles
Warner Records singles
Donna Summer songs
European Hot 100 Singles number-one singles
Number-one singles in Australia
Sam Smith (singer) songs
Song recordings produced by Giorgio Moroder
Song recordings produced by Pete Bellotte
Songs written by Donna Summer
Songs written by Giorgio Moroder
Songs written by Pete Bellotte
UK Singles Chart number-one singles
United States National Recording Registry recordings
Hi-NRG songs
Number-one singles in Austria
Number-one singles in Belgium
Number-one singles in the Netherlands
Dutch Top 40 number-one singles
LGBT-related songs